The 2008–09 Northern Illinois Huskies men's basketball team represented Northern Illinois University in the 2008–09 college basketball season.  This season was head coach Ricardo Patton's second season at Northern Illinois University.

Roster

Schedule and results

Northern Illinois
Northern Illinois Huskies men's basketball seasons
Northern
Northern